The 2nd constituency of Loir-et-Cher is one of three French legislative constituencies in the Loir-et-Cher department, in the Centre-Val de Loire region.

It consists of the (pre-2015 cantonal re-organisation) cantons of
Bracieux, Lamotte-Beuvron, Mennetou-sur-Cher, Neung-sur-Beuvron, Romorantin-Lanthenay (North and South), Saint-Aignan, Salbris, and Selles-sur-Cher.

Deputies

Election Results

2022

 
 
 
 
 
 
 
|-
| colspan="8" bgcolor="#E9E9E9"|
|-

2017

2012

References

2